Cyril (also Cyrillus or Cyryl) is a masculine given name. It is derived from the Greek name  (Kýrillos), meaning 'lordly, masterful', which in turn derives from Greek  (kýrios) 'lord'. There are various variant forms of the name Cyril such as Cyrill, Cyrille, Ciril, Kirill, Kiryl, Kirillos, Kyrylo, Kiril, Kiro, and Kyrill.

It may also refer to:

Christian patriarchs or bishops
 Cyril of Jerusalem (c. 313 – 386), theologian and bishop
 Cyril of Alexandria (c. 376 – 444), Patriarch of Alexandria
 Cyril the Philosopher (link to Saints Cyril and Methodius), 9th-century Greek missionary, co-invented the Slavic alphabet, translated the Bible into Old Church Slavonic
 Pope Cyril II of Alexandria reigned 1078–1092
 Greek Patriarch Cyril II of Alexandria reigned in the 12th century
 Cyril of Turaw (1130–1182), Belorussian bishop and orthodox saint
 Pope Cyril III of Alexandria reigned 1235–1243
 Cyril, Metropolitan of Moscow died 1572
 Cyril Lucaris (Patriarch Cyril I of Constantinople), reigned for six terms between 1612 and 1638
 Cyril II of Constantinople, patriarch in 1633, 1635–1636, 1638–1639
 Patriarch Cyril III of Constantinople, patriarch in 1652 and 1654
 Cyril IV of Constantinople, patriarch 1711–1713
 Cyril V Zaim, Melkite patriarch of Antioch died 1720
 Cyril VI Tanas, Melkite patriarch of Antioch 1724–1760
 Patriarch Cyril V of Constantinople, patriarch in 1748–1751, 1752–1757
 Cyril VII Siaj, Melkite patriarch of Antioch 1794–1796
 Patriarch Cyril VI of Constantinople, patriarch in 1813–1818
 Patriarch Cyril II of Jerusalem, reigned 1845–1875
 Patriarch Cyril VII of Constantinople, patriarch in 1855–1860
 Pope Cyril IV of Alexandria reigned 1854–1861
 Pope Cyril V of Alexandria reigned 1874–1921
 Cyril VIII Jaha, Melkite patriarch of Antioch 1902–1916
 Cyril IX Moghabghab, Melkite patriarch of Antioch 1925–1946
 Patriarch Cyril of Bulgaria, reigned 1953–1971
 Pope Cyril VI of Alexandria, reigned 1959–1971

Other individuals
 Cyrillus, 5th-century Greek jurist
 Cyril Abiteboul (born 1977), French motor racing engineer and manager, formerly the Managing Director of Renault Sport F1 Team
 Cyril Almeida, Pakistani journalist
 Cyril Eugene Attygalle, Sri Lankan Sinhala politician
 Cyril Benson, founder of British company Bensons for Beds
 Cyril Bourlon de Rouvre (born 1945), French businessman and politician
 Sir Cyril Burt (1883–1971), psychologist
 Cyril Connolly (1903–1974), English literary critic and writer
 Cyril Delevanti (1889–1975), British actor
 Cyril Despres (born 1974), French motorcycle rider
 Cyril De Zoysa (1896–1978), Sri Lankan businessman and Buddhist revivalist
 Cyril Dissanayaka, Sri Lankan Sinhala senior police officer
 Cyril Dodd (1844–1913), British politician
 Cyril Domoraud (born 1971), Ivorian football player (senior career 1992–2008) who played for the Côte d'Ivoire national team (1995–2006)
 Cyril Fernando (1895–1974), Sri Lankan Sinhala clinician and researcher
 Cyril Fletcher (1913–2005), English comedian, actor and businessman
 Cyril Gautier (born 1987), French racing cyclist
 Cyril Goulden (1897–1981), Welsh/Canadian geneticist, statistician, and agronomist
 Cyril Grayson (born 1993), American football player
 Cyril Haran (1931–2014), Gaelic footballer and manager, priest, scholar and schoolteacher
 Cyril Stanley Harrison (1915–1998), English cricketer
 Cyril Leo Heraclius, Prince Toumanoff (born Toumanishvili) (1913–1997), Russian-born historian and genealogist who was a Professor Emeritus at Georgetown University
 Cyril Herath (died 2011), Inspector-General of Sri Lanka Police from 1985 to 1988
 Cyril Jordan (born 1948), American guitarist and founder of the Flamin' Groovies
 Cyril Knowles (1944–1991), English footballer
 Cyril Lawrence (1920–2020), English footballer 
 Cyril Lewis (1909–1999), Welsh footballer
 Sister M. Cyril Mooney (born 1936), educational innovator in India
 Cyril Nicholas (1898–1961), Sri Lankan Burgher army captain, civil servant, and forester
 Elder Cyril Pavlov (1919–2017), Russian Orthodox Christian monk, mystic and wonder-worker
 Cyril Perkins (1911–2013), English cricketer
 Cyril C. Perera (1923–2016), Sri Lankan Sinhala author, translator of world literature into Sinhala
 Cyril E. S. Perera (1892-1968), Sri Lankan Sinhala member of the Ceylon House of Representatives
 Cyril Pinto Jayatilake Seneviratne (1918–1984), Sri Lankan Sinhala military officer and politician
 Cyril Ponnamperuma (1923–1994), Sri Lankan Sinhala scientist in the fields of chemical evolution and the origin of life
 Cyril Ramaphosa (born 1952), South African president, businessman, and trade unionist
 Cyril Ranatunga, Sri Lankan Sinhala army general
 Cyril Richardson (born 1990), American football player
 Cyril Rioli (born 1989), Australian rules footballer
 Cyril Smith (1928–2010), English Liberal politician
 Cyril Takayama, (born 1973), American-Japanese magician
 Cyril Wickramage (born 1932), Sri Lankan Sinhala actor, director, and vocalist

Fictional characters
 Cyril "Blakey" Blake, the bus depot inspector from the 1970s British comedy TV series On the Buses
 Cyril Fielding, character in E. M. Forster's novel A Passage to India
 Cyril Figgis, character in the TV series Archer
 Cyril Gray, character from the film Nanny McPhee and the Big Bang, played by Eros Vlahos
 Cyril Kinnear, the menacing and urbane mastermind from the 1971 British crime film Get Carter
 Cyril Orchard, the murder victim in the 1948 Nero Wolfe mystery And Be A Villain.
 Cyril Playfair, the reverend from the 1952 film The Quiet Man
 Cyril Proudbottom, Mr. Toad's horse from the 1949 film The Adventures of Ichabod and Mr. Toad
 Cyril O'Reily, character from television series Oz
 Cyril Sneer, the villain aardvark of the 1980s cartoon series The Raccoons
 Cyril Woodcock, from the film Phantom Thread, played by Lesley Manville
 Cyril the Fogman, a character from the television series Thomas & Friends
 Cyril, a character from Doctor Who
 Cyril, a character from Fire Emblem: Three Houses
 Cyril the Ice Dragon, from The Legend of Spyro
 Cyril the Squirrel, from Maisy
Cyril, the main character in  The Heart's Invisible Furies by John Boyne
Cyril, a giant squirrel kaiju from Rampage: Total Destruction

See also
 Cyrille
 Cyrillus (crater) on the moon
 Cirillo
 Kyril
 Kyrylo

Given names of Greek language origin
Masculine given names
Unisex given names